Ekemini Bassey (born 22 October 1987) is an Austrian bobsledder. He competed in the four-man event at the 2018 Winter Olympics.

He is also a sprinter.

References

1987 births
Living people
Austrian male sprinters
Austrian male bobsledders
Olympic bobsledders of Austria
Bobsledders at the 2018 Winter Olympics
Place of birth missing (living people)
Athletes (track and field) at the 2015 European Games
European Games gold medalists for Austria
European Games medalists in athletics